Delanco Township is a township in Burlington County, in the U.S. state of New Jersey. As of the 2020 United States census, the township's population was 4,824, an increase of 541 (+12.6%) from the 2010 census count of 4,283, which in turn reflected an increase of 1,046 (+32.3%) from the 3,237 counted in the 2000 census.

Delanco was named for the Delaware River and Rancocas Creek, which border the community. It was originally called Del-Ranco or Delaranco, a syllabic abbreviation later shortened to Delanco.

It is a dry township where alcohol cannot be sold.

History
What is now Delanco Township was originally incorporated as Beverly Township  by an act of the New Jersey Legislature on March 1, 1859, within Willingboro Township. Delanco was a geographical place name by 1868, and probably earlier. At its creation, Beverly Township included Beverly city, which separated as an independent municipality c. 1877. Portions of the township were taken to create Edgewater Park on February 26, 1924. The township's name was changed to Delanco Township as of December 20, 1926, based on the results of a referendum held on November 2, 1926.

In April 1861, the Sixth Massachusetts Militia passed through Delanco, on their way to Washington to defend the federal capital.  According to the report of Colonel Edward F. Jones during their travel, James Brady was "taken insane" and left in Delanco Township with J. C. Buck. When the regiment arrived in Baltimore, Maryland, it was attacked during the Baltimore riot of 1861.

Geography
According to the United States Census Bureau, the township had a total area of 3.33 square miles (8.62 km2), including 2.36 square miles (6.11 km2) of land and 0.97 square miles (2.52 km2) of water (29.19%).

The township borders the municipalities of Beverly, Delran Township, Edgewater Park Township, Riverside Township, Willingboro Township in Burlington County; and also borders Bensalem Township and the city of Philadelphia in Pennsylvania, across the Delaware River.

Demographics

2010 census

The Census Bureau's 2006–2010 American Community Survey showed that (in 2010 inflation-adjusted dollars) median household income was $77,357 (with a margin of error of +/− $9,985) and the median family income was $82,368 (+/− $9,070). Males had a median income of $56,333 (+/− $12,752) versus $46,625 (+/− $9,993) for females. The per capita income for the borough was $33,943 (+/− $4,082). About 1.5% of families and 4.3% of the population were below the poverty line, including none of those under age 18 and 1.9% of those age 65 or over.

2000 census
As of the 2000 United States census there were 3,237 people, 1,227 households, and 892 families residing in the township. The racial makeup of the township was 95.89% White, 1.92% African American, 0.25% Native American, 0.40% Asian, 0.40% from other races, and 1.14% from two or more races. Hispanic or Latino of any race were 1.95% of the population.

There were 1,227 households, out of which 33.2% had children under the age of 18 living with them, 54.4% were married couples living together, 13.7% had a female householder with no husband present, and 27.3% were non-families. 22.8% of all households were made up of individuals, and 9.5% had someone living alone who was 65 years of age or older. The average household size was 2.64 and the average family size was 3.09.

In the township the population was spread out, with 24.9% under the age of 18, 7.3% from 18 to 24, 32.5% from 25 to 44, 22.1% from 45 to 64, and 13.3% who were 65 years of age or older. The median age was 37 years. For every 100 females, there were 93.9 males.  For every 100 females age 18 and over, there were 92.7 males.

The median income for a household in the township was $50,106, and the median income for a family was $56,985. Males had a median income of $40,727 versus $28,144 for females. The per capita income for the township was $21,096.  About 6.8% of families and 9.5% of the population were below the poverty line, including 13.6% of those under age 18 and 10.0% of those age 65 or over.

Government

Local government
Delanco Township is governed under the Township form of government, one of 141 municipalities (of the 564) statewide that use this form. The Township Committee is the township's governing body and is responsible for formulating policies, approving the annual budget and enacting ordinances and resolutions to provide a legislative framework. Voters approved a measure in 2000 that expanded the Township Committee from three to five members starting in 2002. The Township Committee is comprised of five members who are elected directly by the voters at-large in partisan elections to serve three-year terms of office on a staggered basis, with either one or two seats coming up for election each year as part of the November general election in a three-year cycle. At an annual reorganization meeting, the Township Committee selects one of its members to serve as Mayor and another as Deputy Mayor.

, members of the Delanco Township Committee are Mayor Mike Templeton (D, term on committee ends December 31, 2024; term as mayor ends 2022), Deputy Mayor Fernand C. Ouelette (D, term on committee ends 2023; term as deputy mayor ends 2022), Matt Bartlett (R, 2024), Kate Fitzpatrick (R, 2022) and Kristine Holland (D, 2022).

Delanco's Chief of Police is Jesse DeSanto. Delanco Township's Administrator is Richard Schwab. The Township Clerk and Assistant Administrator is Janice Lohr.

Federal, state and county representation 
Delanco Township is located in the 3rd Congressional District and is part of New Jersey's 7th state legislative district.

 

Burlington County is governed by a Board of County Commissioners comprised of five members who are chosen at-large in partisan elections to serve three-year terms of office on a staggered basis, with either one or two seats coming up for election each year; at an annual reorganization meeting, the board selects a director and deputy director from among its members to serve a one-year term. , Burlington County's Commissioners are
Director Felicia Hopson (D, Willingboro Township, term as commissioner ends December 31, 2024; term as director ends 2023),
Deputy Director Tom Pullion (D, Edgewater Park, term as commissioner and as deputy director ends 2023),
Allison Eckel (D, Medford, 2025),
Daniel J. O'Connell (D, Delran Township, 2024) and 
Balvir Singh (D, Burlington Township, 2023). 
Burlington County's Constitutional Officers are
County Clerk Joanne Schwartz (R, Southampton Township, 2023)
Sheriff James H. Kostoplis (D, Bordentown, 2025) and 
Surrogate Brian J. Carlin (D, Burlington Township, 2026).

Politics
As of March 2011, there were a total of 2,927 registered voters in Delanco Township, of which 1,001 (34.2% vs. 33.3% countywide) were registered as Democrats, 703 (24.0% vs. 23.9%) were registered as Republicans and 1,220 (41.7% vs. 42.8%) were registered as Unaffiliated. There were 3 voters registered as Libertarians or Greens. Among the township's 2010 Census population, 68.3% (vs. 61.7% in Burlington County) were registered to vote, including 85.1% of those ages 18 and over (vs. 80.3% countywide).

In the 2012 presidential election, Democrat Barack Obama received 1,406 votes here (59.2% vs. 58.1% countywide), ahead of Republican Mitt Romney with 933 votes (39.3% vs. 40.2%) and other candidates with 23 votes (1.0% vs. 1.0%), among the 2,375 ballots cast by the township's 3,153 registered voters, for a turnout of 75.3% (vs. 74.5% in Burlington County). In the 2008 presidential election, Democrat Barack Obama received 1,374 votes here (57.7% vs. 58.4% countywide), ahead of Republican John McCain with 967 votes (40.6% vs. 39.9%) and other candidates with 18 votes (0.8% vs. 1.0%), among the 2,382 ballots cast by the township's 2,894 registered voters, for a turnout of 82.3% (vs. 80.0% in Burlington County). In the 2004 presidential election, Democrat John Kerry received 1,097 votes here (54.7% vs. 52.9% countywide), ahead of Republican George W. Bush with 881 votes (43.9% vs. 46.0%) and other candidates with 21 votes (1.0% vs. 0.8%), among the 2,007 ballots cast by the township's 2,509 registered voters, for a turnout of 80.0% (vs. 78.8% in the whole county).

In the 2013 gubernatorial election, Republican Chris Christie received 982 votes here (60.6% vs. 61.4% countywide), ahead of Democrat Barbara Buono with 574 votes (35.4% vs. 35.8%) and other candidates with 24 votes (1.5% vs. 1.2%), among the 1,620 ballots cast by the township's 3,174 registered voters, yielding a 51.0% turnout (vs. 44.5% in the county). In the 2009 gubernatorial election, Democrat Jon Corzine received 756 ballots cast (49.2% vs. 44.5% countywide), ahead of Republican Chris Christie with 666 votes (43.3% vs. 47.7%), Independent Chris Daggett with 78 votes (5.1% vs. 4.8%) and other candidates with 25 votes (1.6% vs. 1.2%), among the 1,537 ballots cast by the township's 2,973 registered voters, yielding a 51.7% turnout (vs. 44.9% in the county).

Education
The Delanco Township School District serves public school students in kindergarten through eighth grade. As of the 2021–22 school year, the district, comprised of two schools, had an enrollment of 384 students and 27.4 classroom teachers (on an FTE basis), for a student–teacher ratio of 14.0:1. Schools in the district (with 2021–22 enrollment data from the New Jersey Department of Education) are 
M. Joan Pearson Elementary School with 218 students in grades K-5 and 
Walnut Street Middle School with 140 students in grades 6-8.ref>Our Schools, Delanco Township School District. Accessed January 31, 2023.</ref>

For ninth through twelfth grades, public school students attend Riverside High School in Riverside Township as part of a sending/receiving relationship with the Riverside School District. As of the 2021–22 school year, the high school had an enrollment of 428 students and 36.8 classroom teachers (on an FTE basis), for a student–teacher ratio of 11.6:1.

Students from Delanco Township, and from all of Burlington County, are eligible to attend the Burlington County Institute of Technology, a countywide public school district that serves the vocational and technical education needs of students at the high school and post-secondary level at its campuses in Medford and Westampton. All costs associated with attending the school are paid by the home school district, which is also responsible for student transportation to and from the school.

Transportation

Roads and highways

U.S. Route 130 is the main highway directly serving Delanco Twnship, forming the township's southeastern border with Willingboro Township. County Route 543 crosses the township close to the Delaware River. Both roads are oriented southwest to northeast parallel to the Delaware River, but are signed north–south.

Public transportation
The Delanco station is located on Rhawn Avenue providing access to the River Line light rail system, offering southbound service to Camden's Walter Rand Transportation Center (with transfers available to the PATCO Speedline to Philadelphia) and the Pennsauken Transit Center (with transfers available to NJ Transit trains to Philadelphia and Atlantic City) and northbound service to the Trenton Rail Station with connections to NJ Transit trains to New York City, SEPTA trains to Philadelphia, and Amtrak trains on the Northeast Corridor.

NJ Transit provides bus service in Delanco Township on the 419 route that runs between Camden and Burlington.

Notable people

People who were born in, residents of, or otherwise closely associated with Delanco Township include:

 Helen Corinne Bergen (1868–?), author, journalist and critic
 Al Bunge (born 1937), former National Basketball Association first round pick (seventh pick overall) of the Philadelphia Warriors in the 1960 NBA draft
 Joe Burk (1914–2008), competitive oarsman and coach
 Herb Conaway (born 1963), physician who has served in the New Jersey General Assembly since 1998
 Kenneth William Faulkner (born 1947), former member of the New Jersey General Assembly, who was a teacher, school administrator and basketball coach at Burlington Township High School
 Thomas Fletcher (1787–1866), silversmith
 Samuel C. Forker (1821–1900), represented New Jersey's 2nd congressional district in the United States House of Representatives from 1871 to 1873
 Albert McCay (1901–1969), served in the New Jersey Senate from 1952 to 1960

References

External links

 
1859 establishments in New Jersey
Populated places established in 1859
Township form of New Jersey government
Townships in Burlington County, New Jersey
New Jersey populated places on the Delaware River